Lincoln's Inn War Memorial is a war memorial in Lincoln's Inn, London.  It was erected in 1921 as a memorial to members of the Inn of Court who died on active service during the First World War.  It became a Grade II listed building in 1999.

The Portland stone memorial comprises a central pylon with a curved screen incorporating seats to either side, terminating with piers at each end.

The screen and central monument bears the Latin inscription: "HOSPITIUM SOCIIS / SANGUINEM PRO PATRIA LARGITIS / FILIIS PARENTES" ("Offer your solidarity in honour of the allied sons who generously gave their blood for their country"), which can also be read as two separate inscriptions: "SANGUINEM PRO PATRIA LARGITIS" ("For those who generously gave their blood for their country") and "HOSPITIUM SOCIIS / FILIIS PARENTES" ("Offer your solidarity in honour of the allied sons").  The end piers bear the inscriptions "CIƆ IƆ CCCC XIV" and " CIƆ IƆ CCCC XIX" using  Roman numerals in the unusual apostrophus form for the dates 1914 (MDCCCXIV) and 1919 (MDCCCXIX).

Brass plaques on the inside face of each pier record the names of the fallen from the First World War, listing 35 people in total.  A bronze plaque on the central pylon listing 66 further names of the fallen from the First World War, in two columns.  A further plaque was added listing another 29 names from the Second World War, including Prince George, Duke of Kent.

Other war memorials in Lincoln's Inn include a table, a book of remembrance, a plaque in the chapel, and a memorial to a Zeppelin air raid in 1915.

See also
 Inns of Court War Memorial near Berkhamsted

References
 War memorial, National Heritage List for England, Historic England
 Monument: Lincoln's Inn War Memorial, London Remembers
 Lincolns Inn Cenotaph, War Memorials Online
 Inns of Court, War Memorials Online
 Bar Table, Lincoln's Inn, Imperial War Museum
 Book of Remembrance, Lincolns Inn, Imperial War Museum
 Lincolns Inn German Zeppelin Air Raid 1915, Lincolns Inn, Imperial War Museum
 Inns of Court Regiment – WW2 Tablet, Imperial War Museum

Buildings and structures completed in 1921
Military memorials in London
Grade II listed monuments and memorials
Grade II listed buildings in the London Borough of Camden
World War I memorials in England
Lincoln's Inn